The 1982 National Panasonic Series was an Australian motor racing contest for Australian Formula 1 cars (commonly referred to as Formula Pacific cars). It was the second running of the National Panasonic Series.

The series was won by Charlie O'Brien driving a Ralt RT4.

Schedule
The series was contested over four rounds.

Rounds 1,2 & 3 were contested concurrently with Rounds 2, 4 & 5 of the 1982 Australian Drivers' Championship.

Points system
Series points were awarded on a 9-6-4-3-2-1 basis for each round.

Series standings

References

National Panasonic Series